Programmable controller may refer to: 

 Programmable logic controller
 Programmable automation controller
 Programmable Interrupt Controller
 Universal remote